Manuel José Ossandón Lira (born 2 July 1987) is a Chilean lawyer who is member of the Chilean Constitutional Convention.

References

External links
 BCN Profile

Living people
1988 births
21st-century Chilean lawyers
21st-century Chilean politicians
National Renewal (Chile) politicians
Members of the Chilean Constitutional Convention
Pontifical Catholic University of Chile alumni
People from Santiago